This article serves as an index - as complete as possible - of all the honorific orders or similar decorations received by the Perak Royal Family, classified by continent, awarding country and recipient.

Sultanate of Perak 

 Abduljalilian Branch
 Sultan Azlan Shah of Perak (as Sultan of Perak since 02/1984 & as Yang di-Pertuan Agong from 04/1989 to 04/1994):
  Grand Master and recipient of the Royal Family Order of Perak (DK, since 3 February 1984)
  Founding Grand Master of the Perak Family Order of Sultan Azlan Shah (2000)
  Founding Grand Master of the Azlanii Royal Family Order (2010)
  Grand Knight (or Datuk Sri, SPCM) and Grand Master (since 1984) of the Order of the Cura Si Manja Kini (Perak Sword of State)
  Knight Grand Commander and Grand Master (since 1984) of the Order of the Taming Sari (Perak State Kris, SPTS)
  Knight Grand Commander (or Datuk Sri Paduka) and Grand Master (since 1984) of the Order of the Perak State Crown (SPMP)
 Sultanah Bainun :
  Recipient of the Royal Family Order of Perak (DK) 
  Member First Class of the Azlanii Royal Family Order (DKA I, 2010) 
 Crown Prince Raja Nazrin Shah :
  Recipient of the Royal Family Order of Perak (DK ) 
  Superior Class of the Perak Family Order of Sultan Azlan Shah (DKSA, 18.4.2005) 
  Member First Class of the Azlanii Royal Family Order (DKA I) 
  Grand Knight of the Order of Cura Si Manja Kini (SPCM, 19.4.1986), title : Dato' Sri —currently : 
  Knight Grand Commander of the Order of Taming Sari (SPTS, 19.4.1989) title : Dato' Sri
  Knight Grand Commander of the Order of the Perak State Crown (SPMP) with title Dato' Sri
 Crown Princess Zara Salim Davidson :
  Superior Class of the Perak Family Order of Sultan Azlan Shah (18/05/2007  )
  Member First Class of the Azlanii Royal Family Order
 Raja Azureen, the sultan's eldest daughter 
  Grand Knight of the Order of Cura Si Manja Kini (SPCMS, 19.4.1988), title : Dato' Sri—currently : 
 Her husband, Y.Bhg. Dato’ Sri Muhammad Saleh bin Dato’ Muhammad Ismail
  Grand Knight of the Order of Cura Si Manja Kini (SPCM, 19.4.1988), title : Dato' Sri—currently : 
 late Raja Ashman Shah, sultan's second son : 
  Member Second Class of the Azlanii Royal Family Order (DKA II) 
  Grand Knight of the Order of Cura Si Manja Kini (SPCM, 19.4.1988), title : Dato' Sri—currently : 
 His wife, Noraini Jane of Perak 
  Member Second Class of the Azlanii Royal Family Order (DKA II) 
  Grand Knight of the Order of Cura Si Manja Kini (SPCMS, 19.4.1992), title : Dato' Sri—currently : 
 His son, Raja Ahmad Nazim Azlan Shah, Raja Kechil Sulong
  Member Second Class of the Azlanii Royal Family Order (DKA II, 24.4.2010)
 Current ribbon de the decoration :  (27.8.2016)
 Raja Eleena, the sultan's second daughter 
  Grand Knight of the Order of Cura Si Manja Kini (SPCM, 19.4.1989), title : Dato' Sri—currently : 
 Her husband, Y.Bhg. Datuk Sri Ismail Farouk bin ‘Abdu’llah
  Grand Knight of the Order of Cura Si Manja Kini (SPCM), title : Dato' Sri—currently : 
 Raja Yong Sofia, the sultan's youngest daughter 
  Grand Knight of the Order of Cura Si Manja Kini (SPCM, 19.4.1989), title : Dato' Sri—currently : 
Her husband, Tunku Kamil of Kedah 
  Grand Knight of the Order of Cura Si Manja Kini (SPCM, 19.4.1989), title : Dato' Sri—currently : 

 Iskandarian Branch

 Jaafarian Branch

Malaysia, sultanates and states 
They have been awarded :

Malaysia 
 Sultan Azlan Shah of Perak (as Sultan of Perak since 02/1984 & as Yang di-Pertuan Agong from 04/1989 to 04/1994):
  Grand Master (1989-1994) and recipient of the Order of the Royal House of Malaysia (D.K.M.) 
  Grand Master (1989-1994) and recipient of the Order of the Crown of the Realm (D.M.N.)
  Grand Master (1989-1994) and Knight Commander of the Order of the Defender of the Realm (PMN)
  Commander (PSM, 07/06/1972), Grand Commander (SSM, 1983) and Grand Master (1989-1994) of the Order of Loyalty to the Crown of Malaysia
  Grand Master (1989-1994) of the Order of Merit of Malaysia
  Grand Master (1989-1994) of the Order for Important Services (Malaysia) 
  Grand Master of the Order of the Royal Household of Malaysia
 Sultanah Bainun :
  Recipient of the Order of the Crown of the Realm (DMN)

Sultanate of Johor 
 Sultan Azlan Shah of Perak (as Sultan of Perak since 02/1984 & as Yang di-Pertuan Agong from 04/1989 to 04/1994): 
  First Class of the Royal Family Order of Johor (DK I)

Sultanate of Kedah 
 Sultan Azlan Shah of Perak (as Sultan of Perak since 02/1984 & as Yang di-Pertuan Agong from 04/1989 to 04/1994): 
  Member of the Royal Family Order of Kedah (DK)

Sultanate of Kelantan 
 Sultan Azlan Shah of Perak (as Sultan of Perak since 02/1984 & as Yang di-Pertuan Agong from 04/1989 to 04/1994): 
  Recipient of the Royal Family Order or Star of Yunus (DK)

Sultanate of Negeri Sembilan 
 Sultan Azlan Shah of Perak (as Sultan of Perak since 02/1984 & as Yang di-Pertuan Agong from 04/1989 to 04/1994): 
  Member of the Royal Family Order of Negeri Sembilan (DKNS)

Sultanate of Pahang 
 Sultan Azlan Shah of Perak (as Sultan of Perak since 02/1984 & as Yang di-Pertuan Agong from 04/1989 to 04/1994): 
  Member 1st class of the Family Order of the Crown of Indra of Pahang (DK I) 
  Grand Knight (or Datuk Sri) of the Order of the Crown of Pahang (SIMP)

Sultanate of Perlis 
 Sultan Azlan Shah of Perak (as Sultan of Perak since 02/1984 & as Yang di-Pertuan Agong from 04/1989 to 04/1994):
  Recipient of the Perlis Family Order of the Gallant Prince Syed Putra Jamalullail (DK)
 Crown Prince Raja Nazrin Shah : 
  Knight Grand Commander of the Order of the Crown of Perlis or Star of Safi (SPMP)

Sultanate of Selangor 
 Sultan Azlan Shah of Perak (as Sultan of Perak since 02/1984 & as Yang di-Pertuan Agong from 04/1989 to 04/1994): 
  First Class of the Royal Family Order of Selangor (DK I, 08/11/1985)
 Sultanah Bainun :
  First Class of the Royal Family Order of Selangor (DK I, 11.12.2005)
 Crown Prince Raja Nazrin Shah :
  Second Class of the Royal Family Order of Selangor (DK II, 13.12.2003)

Sultanate of Terengganu 
 Sultan Azlan Shah of Perak (as Sultan of Perak since 02/1984 & as Yang di-Pertuan Agong from 04/1989 to 04/1994): 
  Member first class of the Family Order of Terengganu (DK I, 6.7.1984)

Asian honours

Far East 
They have been awarded :

Brunei 
 Sultan Azlan Shah of Perak (since 02/1984 & as YdPA from 04/1989 to 04/1994): Royal Family Order of the Crown of Brunei (DKMB)

Indonesia 
 Sultan Azlan Shah of Perak (since 02/1984 & as YdPA from 04/1989 to 04/1994): Star of the Republic of Indonesia, 1st Class (09/1990)

Japan 
 Sultan Azlan Shah of Perak (since 02/1984 & as YdPA from 04/1989 to 04/1994): Collar of the Order of the Chrysanthemum (30/09/1991)
 Sultanah Bainun : Grand Cordon of the Order of the Precious Crown (30.9.1991)

South Korea 
 Sultan Azlan Shah of Perak (since 02/1984 & as YdPA from 04/1989 to 04/1994): Supreme Order of Hibiscus

Thailand 
 Sultan Azlan Shah of Perak (since 02/1984 & as YdPA from 04/1989 to 04/1994): Collar of the Order of the Rajamitrabhorn (09/1990)
 Sultanah Bainun : Dame Grand Cross of the Order of Chula Chom Klao (09/1990)

Middle East 
They have been awarded :

Jordan 
 Sultan Azlan Shah of Perak (since 02/1984 & as YdPA from 04/1989 to 04/1994): Collar of the Order of al-Hussein bin Ali

Oman 
 Sultan Azlan Shah of Perak (since 02/1984 & as YdPA from 04/1989 to 04/1994): Collar of the Civil Order of Oman, 1st Class (04/12/1991)

Saudi Arabia 
 Sultan Azlan Shah of Perak (since 02/1984 & as YdPA from 04/1989 to 04/1994): Collar of Badr Chain (7.12.1991)

American honours 
They have been awarded :

Chile 
See also List of Chilean Honours awarded to Heads of State and Royals
 Sultan Azlan Shah of Perak (since 02/1984 & as YdPA from 04/1989 to 04/1994): Grand Cross with Collar of the Order of the Merit of Chile (1992)

European honours 
They have been awarded :

Austria 
 Sultan Azlan Shah of Perak (since 02/1984 & as YdPA from 04/1989 to 04/1994): Grand Star of the Decoration of Honour for Services to the Republic of Austria (08/04/1992)

Germany 
 Sultan Azlan Shah of Perak (since 02/1984 & as YdPA from 04/1989 to 04/1994): Grand Cross Special Class of the Order of Merit of the Federal Republic of Germany (07/09/1992)

United Kingdom 
 Sultan Azlan Shah of Perak (since 02/1984 & as YdPA from 04/1989 to 04/1994): 
 Honorary Knight Grand Cross of the Order of the Bath (GCB) - 1989
 Knight of the Venerable Order of Saint John (KStJ) - 1990

African honours 
They have been awarded :

Sudan 
 Sultan Azlan Shah of Perak (since 02/1984 & as YdPA from 04/1989 to 04/1994): Collar of the Order of Honor of the Sudan (06/06/1991)

References

Notes 

 
Perak